Đorđe Jocić (Serbian Cyrillic: Ђорђе Јоцић; born 24 October 1991) is a Serbian professional footballer who plays as a midfielder.

Playing career 
Jocić began his career in 2009 with TuRU Düsseldorf in the Oberliga Niederrhein. After two seasons abroad in Germany he returned to Serbia to play with FK Novi Sad in the Serbian First League. The following season he played in the Serbian League Vojvodina with FK Radnički Sombor. In 2013, he went abroad to Hungary to play in the top flight with Pécsi MFC. After his stint in Hungary he went overseas to Canada in 2016 to play with the Serbian White Eagles FC in the Canadian Soccer League. In his debut season he won the CSL Championship, after defeating Hamilton City SC by a score of 2–1.

Club statistics

Updated to games played as of 20 November 2013.

References 

1991 births
Living people
Footballers from Belgrade
Serbian footballers
Association football midfielders
TuRU Düsseldorf players
RFK Novi Sad 1921 players
FK Radnički Sombor players
Pécsi MFC players
Serbian White Eagles FC players
Serbian SuperLiga players
Nemzeti Bajnokság I players
Canadian Soccer League (1998–present) players
Serbian expatriate footballers
Expatriate footballers in Germany
Expatriate footballers in Hungary
Expatriate soccer players in Canada
Serbian expatriate sportspeople in Germany
Serbian expatriate sportspeople in Hungary
Serbian expatriate sportspeople in Canada
Serbian League players